Wisner Township may refer to the following places:

 Wisner Township, Franklin County, Iowa
 Wisner Township, Tuscola County, Michigan
 Wisner Township, Cuming County, Nebraska

See also 

 Wisner (disambiguation)

Township name disambiguation pages